Stephen Dean Bardo (born April 5, 1968) is an American retired professional basketball player who played 3 seasons in the National Basketball Association (NBA). He is currently a college basketball analyst.

Basketball career
During his standout career at the University of Illinois, 6'5" Bardo scored 909 points and compiled 495 assists. He was part of the Flyin' Illini team that qualified for the 1989 NCAA men's basketball tournament Final Four. That Fighting Illini team gained the moniker "Flyin' Illini" by Dick Vitale while broadcasting a game during the 1988–89 season. Bardo was named Big Ten defensive player of the year in 1989. Along with Bardo, the other starting members of that team included Nick Anderson, Kendall Gill, Lowell Hamilton, Kenny Battle, and key reserve Marcus Liberty.

Bardo was selected in the 1990 NBA Draft by the Atlanta Hawks, but never played for the team, playing one game (one minute) with the San Antonio Spurs during the 1991–92 NBA season. He also appeared for the Dallas Mavericks and Detroit Pistons, amassing 32 more regular season games, and leaving the National Basketball Association with per-game averages of 2 points, 2 rebounds and one assist.

Bardo also played in France, Italy, Japan, Spain, Venezuela overseas as well as the CBA (Quad City, Wichita Falls, Chicago).  He enjoyed a 10-year professional playing career.

College stats

Post-retirement
Since retiring in 2000, Bardo has worked in broadcasting. He has served as a color analyst for the Illini Sports Network, a sports reporter for WBBM-TV in Chicago, an analyst and reporter for CBS Sports, and a color analyst for college basketball on ESPN and Big Ten Network. He has also participated on ESPN First Take. Additionally, he works as a motivational speaker, and authored the book How To Make The League Without Picking Up The Rock. In 2021, Bardo began filling in as an analyst on Bally Sports Wisconsin's Milwaukee Bucks broadcasts for regular color commentator Marques Johnson.

In May 2015, Bardo, who is African American, publicly criticized the University of Illinois's athletic department over the lack of diversity among prominent head coaches at the university.

References

External links
Stats at BasketballReference

Official website
SportsUnplugged on iTunes

1968 births
Living people
African-American basketball players
American expatriate basketball people in France
American expatriate basketball people in Italy
American expatriate basketball people in Japan
American expatriate basketball people in Spain
American men's basketball players
Atlanta Hawks draft picks
Basketball players from Kentucky
Chicago Rockers players
College basketball announcers in the United States
Women's National Basketball Association announcers
Dallas Mavericks players
Detroit Pistons players
Fabriano Basket players
Illinois Fighting Illini men's basketball players
Joventut Badalona players
Liga ACB players
People from Henderson, Kentucky
Quad City Thunder players
San Antonio Spurs players
Shooting guards
Kawasaki Brave Thunders players
Wichita Falls Texans players
21st-century African-American people
20th-century African-American sportspeople